Trapper Peak may refer to:

 Trapper Peak (Canada), a mountain in the Waputik Range, on the border between Alberta and British Columbia
 Trapper Peak (Montana), a mountain in the Selway-Bitterroot Wilderness Area

See also
 Trapper Mountain, Washington, United States
 Trappers Peak, Washington, United States